Schwienau is a river of Lower Saxony, Germany. It is a left tributary of the Gerdau.

It rises in the Weidebruch north of Brockhöfe near Wriedel. Initially the Schwienau flows through near-natural grassland landscape. After  it has been straightened and directed past a pumping station.

The Schwienau has been artificially straightened throughout much of its route and rarely flows in its natural channel. The banks either side are mainly used for agriculture. Only at Wriedel and east of it the river runs through small woods and untended heath. Its fluvial sediment consists mainly of sand and mud. This affords a habitat particularly for leeches, snails and  shrimp-like animals called scuds. Its water is generally only moderately contaminated.

Tributaries

See also
List of rivers of Lower Saxony

References

Rivers of Lower Saxony
Rivers of Germany